The Aleksis Kivi Memorial is a statue dedicated to the Finnish author Aleksis Kivi (1834–1872), designed and sculpted by Wäinö Aaltonen.

History 
Unveiled on 10 October 1939, the bronze statue is located in the Helsinki Railway Square, in front of the Finnish National Theatre. The statue, along with most of Helsinki's public artwork, is owned and maintained by the Helsinki Art Museum. The sculpture was originally chosen through a contest; Aaltonen's submission was originally a more abstract cubist piece, but the selection committee chose him with the caveat that he would redesign the statue to be more realistic in appearance.

Description 
The memorial depicts a complentative (even melancholic) Kivi sitting in a chair. On the chair are reliefs inspired by three of Kivi's works:  Sydämeni laulu, Keinu and Seitsemän veljestä pakenee Impivaarasta. The back of the chair features two stanzas from his poem, Ikävyys ("Melancholy"):
Mi ikävyys,
mi hämäryys sieluni ympär
kuin syksy-iltainen autiol maal?
Turha vaiva täällä,
turha ompi taistelo
ja kaikkisuus maailman, turha!

En taivasta
mä tahdo, en yötä Gehennan,
enp' enään neitosta syliini suo.
Osani vain olkoon:
tietämisen tuskast pois.
kaik' äänetön tyhjyys olkoon.

What dreadness dear,
what gloaming gloom looms round my soul
like an autumn's eve in a barren land?
All here is vain,
the strife the struggle vain
the world's wide wholeness, vain!

No heav'nly joy
want I, no Gehennan midnight,
no maid e'er again in my arms shall I take.
My lot, be it e'er only:
away from the aches of knowing,
let all be the voiceless void.

See also
 Sibelius monument 
 Equestrian statue of Marshal Mannerheim 
 Three Smiths Statue

References

Notes

References
 Robinson, Douglas, Aleksis Kivi and/as World Literature. Leiden and Boston: Brill, 2017.

External links
 The Aleksis Kivi Memorial at the HAM website

Bronze sculptures in Finland
Statues and sculptures in Helsinki
Aleksis Kivi